Cinematic is the fourth studio album by Australian rapper Illy, first released in November 2013 through ONETWO records.

Recorded at M-Phazes' studio in Melbourne, Australia, the album serves as Illy's first release under his independent label, ONETWO and includes collaborations with Hilltop Hoods, Drapht, Daniel Merriweather and Kira Puru among others. During one particular interview, Illy commented on the album by saying, “This will be my fourth album in five years; I've learned a lot and directed this experience into Cinematic. The concepts are tighter, the hooks are more finessed and the beats are off the chart!”

Cinematic was a critical and commercial success upon release, garnering positive reviews from most critics and debuting and peaking at number-four on the Australian ARIA Albums Chart, thus becoming Illy's first top five album and his highest charting studio release to date. The album was certified gold by the Australian Recording Industry Association for shipments exceeding 35,000 copies. In October 2014, Cinematic received an ARIA Award nomination in the "Best Urban Album" category. However, it lost to the Hilltop Hoods' Walking Under Stars.

Cinematic was preceded by the singles, "On & On", "Youngbloods" and "Cinematic", with the second single debuting and peaking at number thirty-eight on the Australian ARIA Singles Chart, thereby becoming Illy's first top forty hit. The album's fourth single, "Tightrope" meanwhile, became Illy's most successful release (album or single) to date, peaking at number eighteen on the Australian ARIA Singles Chart and attaining a platinum certification.

The album was re-released on 21 November 2014 under the title Cinematic: Uncut, including six new tracks.

Track listing

Promotion 
Aside from the album's singles, Illy also embarked on his 5-date Cinematic tour in March 2014 to promote the album.

Cinematic Tour dates

Critical reception 
Cinematic was generally well received by contemporary music critics. In his review for themusic.com.au, Ben Preece awarded the album four stars and stated, "Illy pulls off his lead role effortlessly, guiding the entire project with the style and class we’ve come to expect from the MC, but seemingly with a new zest that breathes fresh air into what he does". Triple J also gave the album a positive review commenting, "Working with a host of high profile producers such as M-Phazes (Eminem, Bliss N Eso, Kimbra), Illy has pushed outside his musical boundaries, delivering a record that transcends genres and is packed with glitchy pop hooks, soul and epic beats, not to mention Illy’s trademark cutting edge lyrics". However, Navarone Farrell of the Au Review was not as impressed, giving the album a mixed review and an overall rating of 6.6/10. While he praised some of the album's lyrical content, he felt that much of the album's lyrics were "lost in the over-production found on Cinematic". Ultimately, however Farrell concludes that "Cinematic is sure to be a hit with Illy fans and a fresh batch of tweens looking for an easy way onto the hip-hop/rap bandwagon".

Awards and nominations 
Cinematic was nominated for "Best Urban Album" at the 2014 ARIA Music Awards but lost to Walking Under Stars by the Hilltop Hoods.

Charts

Weekly charts

Year-end charts

Certifications

References 

2014 albums
Illy (rapper) albums
Albums produced by M-Phazes